Newtown Radio is a freeform Internet radio station with a studio in Bushwick, Brooklyn, New York. Newtown was founded in 2009 by Mark Brinda, Tariq Abdus-Sabur and Colin Ilgen in a former brewery It features around the clock programming by blogs, artists, and labels.

Several Newtown programs have attracted media attention, including: WTBS, I Have Always Found You Extremely Attractive, Disco Juice, Cock Talk, and' Level Radio.

Artists who have appeared on Newtown include: Laurel Halo, Real Estate, Lower Dens, Small Black, Beach Fossils, The Drums, The Pains of Being Pure At Heart, Dirty Beaches, Dom, Amen Dunes, PC Music, Regal Degal, Weyes Blood, Minks, Widowspeak, Connan Mockasin, Sky Ferreira, DIIV, Mac DeMarco, Craft Spells, Destruction Unit, Jacuzzi Boys, Oh Land, Chelsea Wolfe, Nardwuar, Gardens & Villa, Perfect Pussy, Wampire, Pillar Point, Mood Rings, Light Asylum, Dog Bite, TEEN, Tashaki Miyaki, The Bunker, PAN, Ron Morelli (L.I.E.S.), Traxx, Florian Kupfer, Jackson Lee, TX Connect, Adam X, Tornado Wallace, Shawn O’Sullivan, Nao Katafuchi, Legowelt, Professor Genius, Galcher Lustwerk, and Alvin Aronson,

Showcases 
In 2011, Newtown's Northside festival showcase at Shea Stadium BK in Bushwick with Laurel Halo, Autre Ne Veut, and Steve Summers was reviewed positively in The New York Times by Jon Caramanica.

In 2015, in conjunction with PopRally, the planning committee at The Museum of Modern Art (MoMA), Newtown co-curated four summer concerts in the MoMA Sculpture Garden, featuring: Galcher Lustwerk and DJ Willy Burns, Lower Dens and DJ Stadiums & Shrines, Regal Degal and DJ Michael McGregor, Tei Shi and DJ Lomé.

Video 
Newtown has also produced video sessions of rising indie artists published through Noisey/VICE.

References

External links
 

Internet radio stations in the United States